João Pedro Heinen Silva (born 20 January 1997), known as João Pedro, is a Brazilian footballer who plays as a midfielder for Ponte Preta.

Career statistics

References

External links
 

1997 births
Living people
Brazilian footballers
Association football midfielders
Campeonato Brasileiro Série A players
Campeonato Brasileiro Série B players
Campeonato Brasileiro Série C players
Guaratinguetá Futebol players
Club Athletico Paranaense players
Paraná Clube players
Botafogo de Futebol e Regatas players
Atlético Clube Goianiense players